Baragar is a surname. Notable people with the surname include:

Caleb Baragar (born 1994), American baseball pitcher
Fletcher Baragar (born 1955), Canadian chess player

See also
Baraga (disambiguation)